Chomętówko  (German: Kolonie Gumtow) is a village in the administrative district of Gmina Brzeżno, within Świdwin County, West Pomeranian Voivodeship, in north-western Poland.

References

Villages in Świdwin County